Choreutis ophiosema is a species of moth of the family Choreutidae first described by Oswald Bertram Lower in 1896. It is found in India, Sri Lanka, China, Taiwan, Amoy, the Moluccas, eastern Australia (the Northern Territory and Queensland) and Japan.

The wingspan is about 10 mm. Adults have forewings and hindwings with a complex pattern of orange and brown.

Larvae feed on Bambusa species.

References

External links

Images at Ozanimals

Choreutis
Moths of Australia
Moths of Japan
Moths of Asia
Moths described in 1896